Aston-on-Trent is a civil parish and a village in the South Derbyshire district of Derbyshire, England.  The parish contains 13 listed buildings that are recorded in the National Heritage List for England.  Of these, one is listed at Grade I, the highest of the three grades, one is at Grade II*, the middle grade, and the others are at Grade II, the lowest grade.  The parish contains the village of Aston-on-Trent and the surrounding area.  The Trent and Mersey Canal passes to the east and south of the village, and a lock and bridge on it are listed.  All the other listed buildings are in the village, and consist of houses, a church and items in the churchyard, and a pump house converted into a bus shelter.


Key

Buildings

References

Citations

Sources

 

Lists of listed buildings in Derbyshire
South Derbyshire District